The list of ship commissionings in 2021 includes a chronological list of all ships commissioned in 2021.


References

See also

2021
2021 ships